China–Palestine relations, also referred to as Sino–Palestinian relations, encompasses the long bilateral relationship between China and Palestine dating back from the early years of the Cold War.

During the era of Mao Zedong, China's foreign policy was in support of Third World national liberation movements. In the post-Mao era, China continued to support the Palestinian Liberation Organization in international forums. China recognized the State of Palestine in 1988. Since 1992, China also established formal diplomatic relations with Israel and has since maintained a cordial relationship with both entities.

Palestinian leaders Yasser Arafat and Mahmoud Abbas have both visited China in official capacities, and relations between the two countries has been considered as cordial. China does not consider Hamas ruling the Gaza Strip as a terrorist organization, and officially supports the creation of a "sovereign and independent Palestinian state" based on the 1967 borders with East Jerusalem as its capital.

History
After the victory of the Chinese Communist Party (CCP) in the Chinese Civil War in 1949, the People's Republic of China (PRC) was proclaimed under CCP chairman Mao Zedong. The PRC recognized the State of Israel, but during the 1950s and 1960s, the PRC began to support the Arabs and Palestinians.

During the 1960s the PRC had strongly supported the destruction of Israel and its replacement with a Palestinian Arab State. Mao Zedong linked the existence of Israel to Taiwan, and described them as "bases of imperialism in Asia." The PRC strongly supported Yasser Arafat and the Palestine Liberation Organization (PLO). China had also established close relations with the Fatah party as well. The Chinese Communist Party under Chairman Mao Zedong supported Palestinian armed groups such as the Popular Front for the Liberation of Palestine (PFLP) as well as the Democratic Front for the Liberation of Palestine (DFLP). The Palestinian Liberation Organization established a diplomatic office in China in May 1965. After the PRC was admitted to the United Nations as a member in 1971, it continued to support the Palestinian cause. An embassy of the PLO was opened in Beijing during the summer of 1974.

The PRC supported UN General Assembly Resolution 3379 which had equated Zionism with racism in 1975. The resolution, however, was later revoked with Resolution 4686 in 1991, a vote for which China was absent.

After the death of Mao Zedong in 1976 a new Chinese Communist Party leadership came to power. Deng Xiaoping reduced support for Palestinian military groups. The PRC cut off support for Palestinian military groups and supported the Camp David Accords in 1978.

The PRC still supported the Palestinians and it strongly supported the November 15, 1988, Palestinian Declaration of Independence by Yasser Arafat in Algiers, Algeria despite the objections by both Israel and the United States. The PRC recognised the new State of Palestine on 20 November 1988 and had established full diplomatic relations with it by the end of 1989.

China has assigned formal diplomatic staff to Palestine since 1990. Initially diplomatic affairs were conducted through the Chinese embassy in Tunisia. In December 1995, China has established a foreign office located in the Gaza Strip that acted as a de facto embassy and liaison office to the Palestinian Liberation Organization; however, the Ambassador to Tunisia continued to act as the main diplomatic officer to Palestine until 2008. In May 2004, the office, officially named Office of the People's Republic of China to the State of Palestine, was moved to Ramallah. The director of the office is accorded ambassadorial ranks in the Chinese foreign service.

Contemporary relations
After Mao, the PRC has continued to support the Palestinian cause albeit in a more limited fashion. Under Deng's successors, the PRC has continued its relations with both Israel and the Arab States. Under Chinese leaders Jiang Zemin and Hu Jintao, China has supported the Middle East peace process and the Oslo Accords in principle. Yasser Arafat visited China on 14 occasions.  His successor Mahmoud Abbas has also visited China on multiple occasions.

After the victory of Hamas, a Palestinian military group that favored the restoration of historical Palestine in the 2006 Palestinian elections, China refused to call the group a terrorist organization and called them elected representatives of the Palestinian People. This statement was clarified by the PRC Foreign Ministry in January 2006. The PRC invited the Hamas Foreign Minister Mahmoud al-Zahar to attend the China-Arab Cooperation Forum in June 2006 ignoring protests by both the United States and Israel but received praise from Mahmoud Abbas.  After the 2008-2009 Gaza War, PRC Foreign Ministry Spokesman Qin Gang urged both parties to solve disputes through dialogue and denounces the use of military force in solving conflicts. After the May 31, 2010 Gaza flotilla raid the PRC Foreign Ministry spokesman Ma Zhaoxu strongly condemned Israel and urged Israel to seriously implement the UN Security Council resolutions and to improve the situation in the Gaza Strip by lifting the blockade.

During the November 2012 Operation Pillar of Defense in the Gaza Strip, a spokesperson from the Ministry of Foreign Affairs of the People's Republic of China told reporters in a news conference that China expressed "concern" to the clashes and urge all sides, particularly Israel, to display restraint and avoid civilian casualties. On November 29, 2012, China voted in favor of UN General Assembly Resolution 67/19 Palestine to non-member observer state status in the United Nations. During the 2014 Israel–Gaza conflict, PRC Foreign Ministry Spokesperson Hong Lei on 9 July 2014 in response to the violence said: "We believe that to resort to force and to counter violence with violence will not help resolve problems other than pile up more hatred. We urge relevant parties to bear in mind the broader picture of peace and the lives of the people, immediately realize a ceasefire, stick to the strategic choice of peace talks and strive for an early resumption of talks."

China voted in favor of UN Security Council Resolution 2334 condemning Israeli settlement building on the West Bank and typically takes positions sympathetic to the Palestinian cause at the United Nations. In early 2016, Chinese leader and CCP general secretary Xi Jinping reasserted China's support for "the establishment of a Palestinian state with its capital being eastern Jerusalem" in a meeting with the Arab League. Xi also announced an aid project of 50 million yuan ($7.6 million) for a solar power stations in the Palestinian territories.

Chinese Foreign Minister Wang Yi called the lack of "an independent [Palestinian] state with full sovereignty" a "terrible injustice" in an April 2017 meeting between Palestinian Foreign Minister Riyad al-Maliki. Wang went on to say that China supports Palestinians' efforts to create an independent state based on the borders set before the 1967 Six-Day War as well as the establishment of its future capital in East Jerusalem. In July 2017, Chinese leader Xi Jinping delivered a further formalization of China's positions in his "Four Points" on the "issue of Israel-Palestine conflict", the first of which was that China supported the establishment of an independent, sovereign Palestine within the framework of the two-state solution based on the 1967 borders, with East Jerusalem as its capital.

In July 2019, Palestine was one of the 54 countries which issued a joint statement supporting China's policies in its Xinjiang region at the United Nations (UN). A year after in June 2020, Palestine also backed the Hong Kong national security law at the UN.

See also

Foreign relations of China
Foreign relations of Palestine

References

External links
Office to the Palestinian National Authority
PRC Embassy in Palestine

 
Palestine
Bilateral relations of the State of Palestine